Yentaganahalli is a village in Nelamangala taluk, Bangalore Rural district, Karnataka, India. The population was 1,158 at the 2011 Indian census.

References

Villages in Bangalore Rural district